The Nakhon Nayok River originates in Khao Yai National Park. It flows southwest, passes through Mueang Nakhon Nayok District, Ban Na District, and Ongkharak District of Nakhon Nayok Province. It then empties into the Bang Pakong River in Ban Sang District, Prachinburi Province at Pak Nam Yothaka.

Nakhon Nayok
Geography of Nakhon Nayok province